The 2014–15 Southern Miss Lady Eagles basketball team represented the University of Southern Mississippi during the 2014–15 NCAA Division I women's basketball season. The Lady Eagles, led by eleventh year head coach Joye Lee-McNelis, play their home games at Reed Green Coliseum and are members of Conference USA. They finish the season 25–11, 13–5 in C-USA play to finish in third place. They advanced to the championship game of the C-USA women's tournament where they lost to Western Kentucky. They were invited to the Women's National Invitation Tournament where they defeated Texas Southern in the first round, TCU in the second round, Eastern Michigan in the third round before falling to Michigan in the quarterfinals.

Roster

Rankings

Schedule

|-
!colspan=9 style="background:#F1C500; color:#000000;"| Exhibition

|-
!colspan=9 style="background:#F1C500; color:#000000;"| Regular season

|-
!colspan=9 style="background:#F1C500; color:#000000;"| Conference USA Tournament

|-
!colspan=9 style="background:#F1C500; color:#000000;"|WNIT

See also
 2014–15 Southern Miss Golden Eagles basketball team

References

Southern Miss Lady Eagles basketball seasons
Southern Miss